Kattagaram (South) is a village in the Udayarpalayam taluk of Ariyalur district, Tamil Nadu, India.

Demographics 

As per the 2001 census, Kattagaram (South) had a total population of 1857 with 872 males and 985 females.

References 

Villages in Ariyalur district